Keno Daas (rock carvings) is an archaeological site in Gilgit, Gilgit-Baltistan, Pakistan. These are the important rock carvings, and are located just outside Gilgit, towards Hunza Valley.

References

Archaeological sites in Gilgit-Baltistan
History of Gilgit-Baltistan
Monuments and memorials in Gilgit-Baltistan
Buildings and structures in Gilgit-Baltistan